Hardmead is a small village in the unitary authority area of the City of Milton Keynes, Buckinghamshire, England. The village is close to the A422 road, on a very small road linking that to nearby Newton Blossomville. Together with the neighbouring village of Astwood, it forms the civil parish of Astwood and Hardmead.

The village name is Old English in origin, and means 'Heoruwulf's meadow'.  In the Domesday Book of 1086 it was called Herulfmede. The village is very small with a population of around 100 people. The nearest pub is located one mile away in Astwood and the nearest shop is about four miles distant.

The former church of St Mary's Hardmead is Grade I listed and parts date from the 12th century. It has been redundant since the 1980s and is now in the care of the charity Friends of Friendless Churches. There are monuments in the church to the Catesby family and to the explorer Robert Shedden.

References

External links

Villages in Buckinghamshire
Areas of Milton Keynes
Civil parishes in Buckinghamshire